The Craftsman was a magazine founded by the American furniture designer Gustav Stickley that championed the American Arts and Crafts movement.

History
The Craftsman was founded by Stickley in October 1901. A key figure in the early years was art historian and Syracuse University professor Irene Sargent. She wrote most of the magazine's first three issues herself —including the inaugural issue's cover story on William Morris — and thereafter usually wrote each issue's lead article while acting as managing editor and layout designer. Her writings in The Craftsman, along with the architectural designs the magazine published, helped to shape public understanding of the American Arts and Crafts aesthetic and contributed greatly to the magazine's success. 

In 1904, Stickley moved the magazine to New York City and Sargent remained in Syracuse to write for other publications.

The Craftsman put out its last issue in December 1916. The following year, it merged with Art World.

Stickley's own home in Syracuse, New York, became the first home with an exclusive Craftsman interior.  Views of its interior and plans were published in The Craftsman in 1903.  The house was added to the National Register of Historic Places in 1984. A reprint of the 1903 article in The Craftsman forms part of the NRHP nomination document.

References

External links

 Full Digital Archive - University of Wisconsin Library

Architecture in the United States
Visual arts magazines published in the United States
American Craftsman architecture
Arts and Crafts architecture
Arts and Crafts movement
Architecture magazines
Defunct magazines published in the United States
Magazines established in 1901
Magazines disestablished in 1916
Magazines published in New York (state)
Mass media in Syracuse, New York
Design magazines
Arts and crafts magazines